Wieck auf dem Darß is a municipality in the Vorpommern-Rügen district, in Mecklenburg-Vorpommern, Germany.

Geography
Wieck is situated at the southern shore of the peninsula Darß at the coastal lagoon (Low German: Bodden), between Born and the Baltic seaside resort Prerow.

History
For centuries, Wieck belonged to the Duchy of Pomerania and became Swedish after the Thirty Years' War. After Napoleon, Wieck became in 1815 Pomeranian again. After World War II, it was part of the district of Ribnitz-Damgarten. Wieck now belongs to the federal state of Mecklenburg-Vorpommern.

Places of interest
Wieck Harbour 
Typical small thatched cottages
Information centre of the national park with a huge exhibition
Galleries with works of local artists

Landscape
The Darß is part of the former islands Fischland, Darß and Zingst. The peninsula is part of the Western Pomerania Lagoon Area National Park. The surrounding of Wieck is famous for being a resting place for tens of thousands of migrating cranes and geese. Tourism has long been a source of income and been increased after the German reunification, but the Darß is still far from becoming a crowded tourist place.

References

External links
 information centre of the national park
 national park